London Buses route 180 is a Transport for London contracted bus route in London, England. Running between Erith and North Greenwich, it is operated by Stagecoach London.

History
In June 1992, a South Yorkshire Passenger Transport Executive Leyland-DAB articulated bus was trialled for a month on the route along with a three-axle Citybus Leyland Olympian. On 14 February 1998, operation of the route passed from Selkent to Harris Bus. After Harris Bus ran into financial difficulty, on 25 March 2000 it was taken over by East Thames Buses. 

On 3 October 2009, East Thames Buses was sold to London General, which included a five-year contract to operate route 180. London General retained the route when re-tendered with a new contract commencing on 1 October 2016. In December 2017, it was transferred from Belvedere garage to Morden Wharf garage.

On 2 October 2021, the route was taken over by Stagecoach London.

In July 2017 Transport for London announced proposed changes to route 180 in anticipation of the opening of the Elizabeth line with route 180 to be diverted after Charlton to run to North Greenwich instead of Lewisham. The change was implemented on 14 May 2022.

Route
Route 180 operates via these primary locations:
Erith
Belvedere
Abbey Wood station  
Plumstead station 
Woolwich Arsenal station  
Charlton station 
Greenwich Peninsula
North Greenwich station

Vehicles
Since November 2021, the route has been partially operated by Alexander Dennis Enviro400 bodied BYD K10 electric buses.

References

External links

Bus routes in London
Transport in the London Borough of Bexley
Transport in the London Borough of Lewisham
Transport in the Royal Borough of Greenwich